Dan Duţescu (21 October 1918 – 26 September 1992) was a professor of English language and literature at the University of Bucharest, Romania, and a member of the Romanian Writers' Union.

A graduate of the School of English Studies of the Bucharest University's Department of Letters, he taught Romanian at the Universities of London (1964-1965) and Cambridge (1971-1973).

He had a son, Dan, and a daughter, Taina Duţescu-Coliban, a linguist and mountain climber who went missing in 1992 while trying to climb Mt. Dhaulaghiri.

Works

Published books (selection) 
 Limba engleză fără profesor ("Teach Yourself English"), co-author (with Leon Levițchi)
 Humour in English (Ed. Ştiinţifică, 1964)
 Manual de conversaţie în limba engleză (ed. I - Ed. Ştiinţifică, 1970; ed. II - 1973; ed. III - 1976)
 Spoken English - Manual de conversaţie în limba engleză (ed. a IV-a, Ed. Miron, 1991)

Translations (selection) 
 Antologia bilingvă Shakespeare ("Shakespeare Bilingual Anthology"), co-author (with Leon Levițchi), 1964
 Hamlet, co-author (with Leon Levițchi)
 Richard III, co-author (with Leon Levițchi)
 Beowulf, co-author (with Leon Levițchi)
 Povestiri din Canterbury ("The Canterbury Tales") by Geoffrey Chaucer
 Trolius si Cressida ("Troilus and Criseyde") by Geoffrey Chaucer
 Cartea ducesei ("The Book of the Duchess") by Geoffrey Chaucer
 Cartea faimei ("The House of Fame") by Geoffrey Chaucer
 Legenda femeilor vestite ("The Legend of Good Women") by Geoffrey Chaucer
 Like Diamonds in Coal Asleep, co-author (with Leon Levițchi and Andrei Bantaș)
 Romanian Poets of Our Time, co-author, 1974, Univers Publishing House
 Meșterul Manole

Awards 
 He was awarded the Romanian Writers' Union Translation Prize for his translations twice, for his translations of Chaucer and Meșterul Manole

References 

 Aurel Sasu, Dictionarul biografic al literaturii române (A-L), Paralela 45, Pitesti, 2006, p. 546
 Andrei Bantaș, Un spirit fermecător: Dan Duțescu, in România literară, 7 Oct. 1992
 Zoe Dumitrescu Bușulenga, in Secolul 20, nr. 7, 1974
 Andrei Bantaș, in Argeș, nr. 3, 1978
 Pia Teodorescu Brânzeu, in Orizont, nr. 38, 1982
 Dan Grigorescu, in Literatorul, nr. 42, 1992

1918 births
1992 deaths
Academic staff of the University of Bucharest
Romanian translators
Translators of William Shakespeare
English–Romanian translators
20th-century translators
20th-century poets